This is a list of the assembly members who belong or have belonged to the 4th legislative period of the National Assembly of Ecuador .

Nationals

Azuay

Bolivar

Canar

Carchi

Chumborazo

Cotopaxi

Gold

Emeralds

Galapagos

Guayas

Imbabura

Loja

The Rivers

Manabi

Morona Santiago

Napo

Orellana

Pastaza

Pichincha

Saint Helena

Santa Domingo de la Tsachilas

Succumbs

Tungurahua

Zamora Chinchipe

Ex-Pats 

Source:

Assembly members who left their seats

Abandoned their party 
The following are the assembly members who left the movement or political party for which they were elected

Changed their bench 
The following assembly members separated from their caucus without abandoning the party for which they were elected:

References 

Government of Ecuador
Politics of Ecuador